Bishop of Colombo may refer to:

 Anglican Bishop of Colombo
 Roman Catholic Bishop of Colombo